is a 1948 Japanese novel by Osamu Dazai. It is considered Dazai's masterpiece  and ranks as the second-best selling novel ever in Japan, behind Natsume Sōseki's Kokoro. The literal translation of the title, discussed by Donald Keene in his preface to the English translation, is "Disqualified From Being Human". The novel, narrated in first person, contains several elements which portray an autobiographical basis but is in fact categorized under the semi-autobiographical genre since the characters in the book are all fictional. The novel presents recurring themes in the author's life, including suicide, social alienation, and depression. Much like the protagonist Yōzō, Dazai attempted suicide a total of five times in his lifetime, with consorts, until ultimately succeeding in taking his own life with his lover at the time, a woman named Tomie Yamazaki. Many believe the book to have been his will, as Dazai killed himself shortly after the last part of the book (which had appeared in serial form) was published.

As of January 1, 2019, the book is in the public domain.

Plot outline 
No Longer Human is told in the form of notebooks left by one , a troubled man incapable of revealing his true self to others, and who, instead, maintains a facade of hollow jocularity. The work is made up of three chapters, or "memoranda", which chronicle the life of Ōba from his early childhood to his late twenties.

 First Memorandum: Overcome by an intense feeling of alienation and otherness and finding it nearly impossible to understand those who surround him who live in egoism and bad faith, Ōba can't help but resort to buffoonery in order to establish interpersonal relationships. He is sexually abused by a male servant and a female servant during his childhood, but decides that reporting it would be useless.
 Second Memorandum: Ōba becomes increasingly concerned over the potential penetrability of his cheerful facade by his schoolmate Takeichi, who sees through his false buffoonery. Ōba befriends him to prevent Takeichi from revealing his secret. As he shows Takeichi the ghost-like paintings of Amedeo Modigliani, he realizes that certain artists express the inner truth of human cruelty through their own trauma. Ōba paints a self-portrait inspired by these artists, which is so dreadful that he dares not show it to anyone except Takeichi, who esteems the picture. He neglects his university studies, out of fear of collective life. Influenced by a fellow artist, Horiki, whom he meets at a painting class, Ōba descends into a vicious pattern of drinking, smoking and harlotry, culminating in a one-night stand with a married woman with whom he attempts to commit double suicide via drowning. Though he survives, she dies, leaving him with nothing but an excruciating feeling of guilt.
 Third Memorandum, Part One: Ōba is expelled from university, and comes under the care of a friend of the family. He tries to have a normal relationship with a single mother, serving as a surrogate father to her little girl but abandons them in favor of living with the madam of a bar he patronizes. Since then he tries to believe the meaning of society for an individual is to escape out of fear of humanity. He drinks heavily, inspired by Rubaiyat of Omar Khayyam. Later, he falls into a relationship with Yoshiko, a young and naive woman who wants him to stop drinking.
 Third Memorandum, Part Two: Thanks to Yoshiko's grounding influence on his life, Ōba stops drinking and finds gainful work as a cartoonist. Then Horiki shows up, turning Ōba to self-destructive behavior again. Worse, at the moment of recalling Crime and Punishment by Dostoevsky while he discusses the antonym of crime with Horiki, Ōba becomes estranged from his wife following an incident where she is sexually assaulted by a casual acquaintance. The ghastly terror and despair brought on by this incident leads Ōba to become an alcoholic and a morphine addict. He is eventually confined to a mental institution and, upon release, moves to an isolated place, concluding the story with numb self-reflection after profound despair.

The story is bookended with two other, shorter chapters from the point of view of a neutral observer, who sees three photos of Ōba and eventually tracks down one of the characters mentioned in the notebooks who knew him personally.

Ōba refers to himself throughout the book using the reflexive pronoun , whereas the personal pronoun  is used both in the foreword and afterword to the book by the writer, whose name is unclear. The name "Ōba" is actually taken from one of Dazai's early works, .

Translations
The novel was first translated into English by Donald Keene as No Longer Human, published 1958 by New Directions in Norfolk, Connecticut. This translation was published in the UK by Peter Owen Publishers in 1959.

The novel received another English translation in 2018 by Mark Gibeau as A Shameful Life, published by Stone Bridge Press.

Adaptations

Film
Ningen Shikkaku was adapted to film in 2009, the 100th anniversary of Dazai's birth. The film was directed by Genjiro Arato, the producer responsible for the award-winning Zigeunerweisen in 1980. Filming started in July, and it was released on February 20, 2010.
The film stars Toma Ikuta as Ōba Yōzō, a young man who finds it hard to relate to the world around him, but masks this sense of alienation with a jovial demeanor. Still, his life spirals toward self-destruction. Actress Satomi Ishihara plays one of the several women in his life, and the only one he marries.
The film was marketed outside Japan under the title Fallen Angel.

A new film titled Ningen Shikkaku was released September 13, 2019, starring Shun Oguri in the role of writer Osamu Dazai, following the story of Dazai's life. The movie is directed by photographer and film director Mika Ninagawa. The movie opened in 320 theaters, ranking 4th place in its first weekend.

Anime series
Another adaptation of the story was told in the four first episodes of the 2009 anime series Aoi Bungaku. It received the Platinum Grand Prize at the Future Film festival in Italy.

Another anime, Bungo Stray Dogs features a character named after Dazai, as well as various influences from No Longer Human. The novel is also referenced in Bungo Stray Dogs Wan! which is a comedy gag spin-off of the original series.

In the series Sayonara Zetsubou Sensei, the main character, Nozomu Itoshiki, is based on Dazai’s novel protagonist.

Anime feature film

Human Lost, a science fiction 3D anime Polygon Pictures feature was directed by Fuminori Kizaki. Katsuyuki Motohiro served as supervisor to the film. Tow Ubukata and screenplay writer. Yūsuke Kozaki was character designer. It premiered on October 22, 2019 in U.S theaters, becoming the first Polygon Pictures film to not be distributed worldwide on Netflix. In this film, the novel is transported to the year 2036.  Breakthroughs in medical technology have led to a system of nanomachines internally implanted in all humans that can reverse illness, injury and even death. But if a person severs their nanomachines from the system, they mutate into monstrous creatures known as "Lost". Oba, Horiki and Hiiragi are now "applicants" with special powers over the Lost.

The movie stars the voice cast of Mamoru Miyano, Kana Hanazawa, Takahiro Sakurai, Jun Fukuyama, and Miyuki Sawashiro.

Manga

Usamaru Furuya created a three-volume manga version of No Longer Human, serialized in Shinchosha's Comic Bunch magazine beginning in number 10, 2009. An English edition was published by Vertical, Inc. in 2011–2012.

Yasunori Ninose created another manga version of No Longer Human, titled Ningen Shikkaku Kai ( kai, "destruction"), serialized in Champion Red from April to July in 2010. Unlike Furuya's version, this manga depicts human beings' negative emotion and sexual intercourse as tentacles, which have enthralled Ninose since he was five years old.

A third version, a straight retelling of the story set in its original pre-WWII setting, was commissioned for the Manga de Dokuha series (comic adaptations of classic literature), published by Gakken. An English edition was published in online format by JManga in 2011.

In 2017, Junji Ito created another manga adaptation of No Longer Human, which retained the original title. In this version, Yōzō meets Osamu Dazai himself during an asylum recovery, thus giving him permission to tell his story in his next book. The manga includes a retelling of Dazai's suicide from Ōba's perspective.

Reception 
William Bradbury of The Japan Times called it a timeless novel, saying that "The struggle of the individual to fit into a normalizing society remains just as relevant today as it was at the time of writing." Serdar Yegulalp of Genji Press noted the strength of Dazai in portraying the situation of the protagonist, describing the novel as "bleak in a way that is both extreme and yet also strangely unforced". Both critics have noted the autobiographical qualities of the novel, but claim that Dazai's style causes readers to connect to Ōba rather than focus on the author.

One modern analyst, Naoko Miyaji, has proposed Dazai was suffering from complex post-traumatic stress disorder when he wrote the book.

References

External links
 "No Longer Human" Movie Official Site 
 "Ningen shikkaku" 2019 Movie Official Site 

1948 novels
20th-century Japanese novels
Books with cover art by Rodrigo Corral
Fiction with unreliable narrators
Novels about alcoholism
Novels by Osamu Dazai
Novels first published in serial form
Novels about heroin addiction
Novels set in Japan
Polygon Pictures
Seinen manga
Shinchosha manga
Vertical (publisher) titles